Ali Baghmisheh (born 8 September 1975) is an Iranian football retired player.

References

 Ali Baghmisheh in TeamMelli.com TeamMelli
 

1975 births
Living people
Sportspeople from Tabriz
Iranian footballers
Tractor S.C. players
Persepolis F.C. players
Paykan F.C. players
Al-Ittihad Kalba SC players
Bargh Shiraz players
Azadegan League players
UAE Pro League players
Persian Gulf Pro League players
Iran international footballers
Iranian expatriate footballers
Expatriate footballers in the United Arab Emirates
Association football forwards